Lena Stojković is a Croatian taekwondo practitioner. She won the gold medal in the women's 46 kg event at the 2021 European Taekwondo Championships held in Sofia, Bulgaria.

References

External links 
 

Living people
Year of birth missing (living people)
Place of birth missing (living people)
Croatian female taekwondo practitioners
Taekwondo practitioners at the 2018 Summer Youth Olympics
European Taekwondo Championships medalists
21st-century Croatian women